Betrayal is a 1974 ABC Movie of the Week directed by Gordon Hessler and starring Amanda Blake and Tisha Sterling, adapted from the novel Only Couples Need Apply by Doris Miles Disney.  It first aired on December 3, 1974.

Plot
An elderly widow, Helen Mercer, hires a young woman, Gretchen Addison, as her companion. Little does she suspect that the woman and her boyfriend are criminals, who plan to make her their next victim, killing her and stealing her money.

Cast
 Amanda Blake  ...  Helen Mercer
 Tisha Sterling  ...  Gretchen Addison alias Adele Murphy
 Dick Haymes  ...  Harold Porter
 Sam Groom  ...  Jay
 Britt Leach  ...  Fred Hawkes
 Edward Marshall  ...  Roy
Ted Gehring  ...  Police Sergeant
 Dennis Cross  ...  Highway Patrolman
Eric Brotherson  ...  Mr. Hall
Vernon Weddle  ...  Savings Officer
 Rene Bond  ...  Betty, waitress
 Lucille Benson  ...  Eunice Russell

See also
 ABC Movie of the Week

External links
 

ABC Movie of the Week
1974 television films
1974 films
Films directed by Gordon Hessler
Films based on American novels